SkyWay Group is an self-proclaimed investment group based in Minsk, Belarus. In 2018, financial regulators in Germany, Lithuania, and five other countries warned that SkyWay "is not registered as a financial services provider and therefore, is not allowed to provide such services in their country," or warned the public about potential fraud the company was perpetrating.

Railway system
The SkyWay Group introduced investment opportunities for technology they referred to as "string transport," which they claimed driverless, elevated railcars would be "strings" traveling on prestressed tensioned steel wires placed in a concrete-filled body. The technology was marketed as a new type of elevated light rail transportation system where small transport units of up to 50,000 passengers per hour.

But in 2017, government officials raised doubts about the company's ability to actually execute construction of the system and was warning investors about potential untruths. Their claims that the rail vehicles can reach speeds of up to 500 kilometers an hour, and that costs would be 20 percent less than normal rail-based subways, were never substantiated. SkyWay also claimed that this technology produces minimal gas and particle emissions, which was never proven.

The transport technology was being tested at the SkyWay EcoTechnoPark, located in Belarus, and at the SkyWay Innovation Centre, located in the United Arab Emirates.

History

In 2001 a prototype of a SkyWay track was constructed in the Russian village Ozyory in Moscow Oblast. The allowable load on this track was tested there using a truck with iron wheels. This site was later deconstructed. A prototype was assessed in Russia in 2008 by the Moscow State University of Railway Engineering concluding that it was "not viable and unsafe".

In October 2015 the SkyWay Group started constructing a test site to demonstrate 'SkyWay' technology. It is situated in Marjina Horka (about 70 km from Minsk) and is called the EcoTechnoPark. In 2016, a Russian government panel that evaluated the technology called it innovative, but only in theory. A prototype of the technology reached speeds of 102 kilometers per hour in 2017. In August 2018 at the EcoFest event, there were three tracks demonstrating prototypes at this site. One is for a vehicle with a maximum capacity of 48 people. The second track is for a 14-seater vehicle and the third is for a 6-seater vehicle. In August 2019 at the EcoFest event, guests were given rides on SkyWay vehicles.

In October 2018 the SkyWay Technologies reached an agreement with the Sharjah Research Technology and Innovation Park (SRTIP) to build a test site at the facility for the project. The company launched an experimental phase of the suspended transport system and demonstrated a passenger pod on a 400 m long track in October 2019.

Operations

Company structure 

SkyWay Group consists of numerous subsidiaries. The SkyWay Group deals with construction of the technology through numerous subsidiaries. SkyWay Group of Companies controls SkyWay Capital which was launched in 2014 to self-finance the projects. They also own and control other companies like "SWIG International Ltd." registered in London and "SkyWay Capital Inc." which is registered in Saint Lucia. These companies function to collect funds for SkyWay projects.

Established in Belarus, operated from an office complex in Minsk and registered under business names including "Euroasian Rail Skyway Systems Holding Ltd.", "First SkyWay Invest Group Limited" and "Global Transport Investment Inc." in places like the British Virgin Islands, London and Saint Lucia. It has been documented that companies in the SkyWay Group seek potential investors all over the world for the development of an elevated rail transport technology they refer to as SkyWay.

Marketing 

In addition to demonstration models at the EcoTechnoPark in Belarus, the company has exhibited its technology at trade fairs like the 3rd Singapore International Transport Congress and Exhibition (SITCE). The SkyWay Group markets itself primarily by promoting investment in its technology to small investors.

SkyWay Group seeks investors through its website and social media. The SkyWay Group have been seeking potential investors all over the world using various forms of marketing such as crowdfunding, telemarketing and multi-level marketing. It has also been documented that the SkyWay Group promote their technology with paid advertising on television and in newspapers, and that financial services are being offered via social media.

The company "Sky Way Invest Group Limited" also launched financial training courses for a fee which it marketed as 'Educational Investment Packages' (EIPs). CONSOB, the Italian financial regulatory agency, banned the sale and advertisement of these investment products in February 2018 because it turned out instead of receiving the "investment training courses" advertised, customers unwittingly ended up with "gift certificates" that could later be converted to company shares on the occasion of its IPO.

Negotiations 

Although countries like Australia, India, Indonesia, Italy and Lithuania started negotiating with the SkyWay Group, they were later cancelled or postponed due to concerns about safety and financial irregularity. Projects are being realized in Belarus and in the United Arab Emirates. The most recent negotiations have taken place in the United Arab Emirates.

The SkyWay Group started negotiating with countries like Lithuania,  Australia, Slovakia, India, Italy and Indonesia.

Lithuania

The municipality of Siauliai in Lithuania signed an investment agreement with SkyWay in 2014. The mayor of Siauliai was later criticized for negotiating with the SkyWay Group and at the end of 2014 he was instructed to cancel the negotiations. In 2014, the Bank of Lithuania released an official statement warning investors of SkyWay. An investigation by the country's Prosecutor General's office found no evidence to prosecute the company. A subsequent lawsuit by SkyWay against the Lithuanian government was dismissed in 2018.

Australia

In 2016  in South Australia, SkyWay negotiated with Flinders University to build a 500 meter long line for $13 million Australian dollars under the direction of ex-state transport minister Rod Hook who worked for SkyWay as an infrastructure consultant. These negotiations were eventually postponed indefinitely in August 2018, as they opted for driverless busses instead.

Slovakia
In July 2016 SkyWay signed a memorandum of understanding with the Slovak University of Technology in Bratislava to promote SkyWay technology in Slovakia.

India
In May 2017 a memorandum of understanding was signed by the minister of Urban Development of the Northern Indian state Himachal Pradesh with SkyWay Group. The minister who negotiated with SkyWay was criticised for doing so "without following proper procedures" Critics also questioned why an agreement was signed with a company that had no operational projects, and for the suitability of the technology to be used in the region.  As a result, negotiations in India have been postponed.

Indonesia

In September 2017 a memorandum of understanding was signed with the University of Indonesia in West Java to build on-campus 'sky trains'.

In December 2017 a memorandum of understanding was signed in Jakarta for a proposed project in Kalimantan.

In February 2018 a memorandum of understanding was signed with the Gadjah Mada University in Central Java to promote research and innovation in the field of transportation.

Members of the Indonesian public complained about the suspicious sale of investment products and the OJK (the Indonesian financial regulatory agency) added SkyWay Capital to its list of prohibited companies. As a result, all negotiations in Indonesia were finally cancelled or postponed and the activities of the Indonesian subsidiary "PT SkyWay Technologies Indonesia" were frozen.

Italy

In early 2018 negotiations took place in Italy. The Secretary of State for the Republic of San Marino signed a memorandum of understanding at the EcoTechnoPark in Belarus in March 2018 for the construction of the San Marino-Rimini line. The mayor of the Sicilian city Messina also used SkyWay's "flying trams" to promote his electoral campaign. Both negotiations were postponed or cancelled because of concerns brought up in local politics and by the Italian regulatory agency Commissione Nazionale per le Società e la Borsa (CONSOB).

In March 2019, Brianza - a region in North-West Lombardy, Italy - invited SkyWay to present a feasibility project for a cable car between Cologno Monzese and Vimercate. Due to controversy surrounding the company these negotiations have been postponed.

United Arab Emirates

In October 2018 an investment agreement was signed between the SkyWay Group and Sharjah Research Technology and Innovation Park in the United Arab Emirates and 25 hectares was allocated to build a SkyWay test-site there.

In February 2019 a memorandum of understanding was signed by the Roads and Transport Authority (RTA) of Dubai with the "Skyway Greentech Company" to develop 'sky pods' there.

In April 2019 the Sheikh Mohammed bin Rashid Al Maktoum, vice-president and prime minister of the UAE and ruler of Dubai, approved a SkyWay suspended transit system that would have a length of 15 kilometres, consist of 21 stations and link vital spots in Dubai.

In November 2019 Sheikh Dr Sultan bin Muhammad Al Qasimi, member of the Federal Supreme Council of the UAE and ruler of Sharjah, witnessed the launch of the experimental phase of the SkyWay project for a hanging track transport system at the Sharjah Research Technology and Innovation Park.

Financial regulation

Regulators in Belgium, Lithuania, Estonia and Latvia have warned investors about SkyWay not being authorized to issue shares in the respective countries.

In February 2018 the Italian regulatory agency CONSOB prohibited the advertisement and sale of certain SkyWay investment products to Italian citizens.

In May 2019 the German regulatory agency BaFin prohibited the public offering of SkyWay investment products to the general public.

In August 2019 the Financial markets Authority (FMA) of the New Zealand reiterated warning about potential Skyway Capital/SWIG scam.

Criticism 

Concerns have been raised in published articles about information the company has posted about itself to promote investment. These concerns include the unrealistic returns promised to investors, the value of its intellectual property, awards it has won, excessive pre-order contracts, and people/organizations who have invested in the company.

Particular criticism relates to misleading information about proposed SkyWay projects. Onliner.by (a popular Belarusian news portal), for example, document that the claims SkyWay made about a proposed project in Mogilev were actually untrue. Similar misleading promotion has been documented relating to proposed projects in Russia, the Crimea and India.

The first critical article by the publication Onliner by was released in September, 2016 and it was commenting on the EcoTechnoPark testing facility being built at the time in Marjina Horka. Anatoly Yunitskiy sued them for damage done to his company and his reputation. Yunitskiy lost the case in June 2017 and was required to pay costs incurred by the defendant. He appealed unsuccessfully against this dismissal.

In May 2017 the Volzhskaya Kommuna newspaper published a critical article on their 'Volga News' information portal about a telemarketing campaign used for funding in Samara. The company's representative Andrei Khovratov filed a lawsuit against the editorial board but in March 2018 the court decided against the plaintiff.

In July 2017 the popular Crimea news sender Primechaniya.ru published an article critical of a telemarketing campaign promoting investment in an unsupported SkyWay project in Sevastopol. Later articles they published include information about legal threats issued by SkyWay employee Andrei Khovratov who represented SkyWay in the Crimea and the unsuccessful litigation in Minsk and Samara.

See also

Automated guideway transit
Crowdfunding
SkyTran
Suspension railway

References

External links
rsw-systems.com

Crowdfunding
Monorails
Proposed rail infrastructure
Rail transport